Gustavo Alfredo Jiménez de Cisneros Rendiles (born 1 June 1945) is a Venezuelan businessman and Chairman of Grupo Cisneros.

Early life and education 
Cisneros is the son of Diego Cisneros and Albertina Cisneros (née Rendíles Martínez).

Cisneros's father, Diego Cisneros, was in business in Caracas from 1929 and received the Pepsi concession for Venezuela in 1940, before going on to gain the concession for private TV channel Venevisión in 1961. The Cisneros family was the first-wealthiest in South America on the 2006 Forbes ranking.

Cisneros graduated from Suffield Academy in Connecticut in 1963. He graduated from Babson College in Massachusetts in 1968.

Grupo Cisneros 
Grupo Cisneros is one of the largest privately held media entertainment organizations in the world. The company has been headquartered in Coral Gables, Florida, since 2000.

Cisneros became President of Grupo Cisneros when he was 25 years old.

Cisneros’ wealth comes from his holdings in media, entertainment, telecommunications and consumer products companies. Grupo Cisneros is one of the largest privately held Spanish-language media and entertainment companies. Until the buyout of Univision, the United States’ leading Spanish-language television network, Cisneros was one of the biggest shareholders of the Company. He also owns Venevision International, which produces and distributes media and entertainment products throughout the world, and Venevisión, a Venezuelan television network. Since 1980 the Group has owned the Miss Venezuela contest and since 2001 also the Leones del Caracas baseball team.

Long an advocate of free enterprise Cisneros has for many years been expanding his operations outside of Venezuela and into overseas markets, including the U.S., Spain and more recently China.

One of his major accomplishments has been a major role in the international development of telenovelas – emotion-packed melodramas based on the harsh realities of life in Latin America that are now broadcast to about 2 billion people around the world.

In August 2013, Gustavo Cisneros appointed his daughter Adriana Cisneros de Griffin as the new Chief Executive Officer (CEO) of Cisneros.

Its opening is scheduled for 2021.

He has been listed among the world's richest men according to Forbes magazine, which estimated his fortune at US$1.1 billion in 2019. His wealth has decreased from its 2014 peak of US$4.4 billion.

Politics 
Although Cisneros and Hugo Chávez were originally friends and Cisneros contributed to Chávez's first presidential campaigns, Cisernos has been accused of involvement in the 2002 Venezuelan coup d'état attempt against Chávez after their relationship became strained because of Chávez's confrontation of the media.

Cisneros has been questioned about his relationship with Chávez.

Philanthropy 

Cisneros supports two philanthropic entities: Colección Patricia Phelps de Cisneros and Fundación Cisneros.

Fundación Cisneros runs a wide range of educational and cultural programs aimed at improving the lives of Latin Americans. These include the AME program for professional development of Latin American educators, visual arts education and awareness based on the Colección Patricia Phelps de Cisneros; PPV, a visual thinking curriculum for Latin American school children, and traveling art exhibits showcasing the talents of Latin American artists for North America and European audiences.

Colección Patricia Phelps de Cisneros is a privately held Latin American art organization based in Venezuela and New York City. Patricia and Gustavo Cisneros began collecting Latin American abstraction after their marriage, in 1970. Over the years, it has grown to more than 2,000 pieces, including about 200 Spanish colonial objects. In addition, the couple have amassed a vast holding of ethnographic material from the Amazon. Based in New York and Caracas, the Colección Patricia Phelps de Cisneros today also includes works by Uruguay's Joaquín Torres-García, Brazil's Lygia Clark and Venezuelan modern masters Jesus Soto, Alejandro Otero, and Carlos Cruz-Diez. The Cisneros Foundation was moving toward building a permanent institution in Caracas in the late 1990s until Hugo Chavez was elected president. In 2007, the foundation encountered resistance from the Chavez government when lending works by Venezuelan painter Armando Reveron (1889-1954) to New York's Museum of Modern Art for the museum's first retrospective devoted to a single Latin American artist in 50 years.

Personal life 
Cisneros has been married to his wife, Patricia, since 1970. She has been a significant MoMA benefactor since 1992, she has been a trustee of the museum and made substantial cash contributions to the museum's recent renovation. Her name is on one of the institution's exhibition rooms. In addition to MoMA, the Los Angeles County Museum of Art, the Hammer Museum, Long Beach's Museum of Latin American Art, and the Museo Reina Sofía in Madrid also have received art loans. Phelps de Cisneros is an active member of the International Council and the Latin American Acquisitions Committee of Tate, London; she is an International Trustee of the Fundación Amigos del Museo del Prado, Madrid; belongs to the Association Centre Pompidou América Latina; the Museum Berggruen’s International Council; and the American Friends of the Fondation Beyeler, among others.

Cisneros has lived in the Dominican Republic since the 1990s.

In addition to Venezuelan citizenship, Cisneros also holds United States, Spanish and Dominican citizenship.

Through his father, Diego Cisneros's paternal side, Cisneros is related to Pablo de Hita y Salazar, who was the 27º Governor of La Florida from 1674 to 1680. As a tribute to his father, Cisneros published a book about the Cisneros family tree.

Commendations 
 1979: Orden Isabel la Católica, Grado Encomienda (1 collar, 1 medallita, 1 botón) – Spain
 1999-01-22: Orden Nacional al Mérito, en el Grado de Oficial (3 medallas) – Ecuador
 1980: Caballero de la Soberana Orden de Malta, Gracia Magistral (6 medallas, 2 botones, 1 prendedor, 2 cajitas rojas vacías, 2 cajitas azules vacías) – Italy
 1982-11-23: Orden Mérito al Trabajo, Primera Clase (1 medalla. 1 botón) – Venezuela
 1983: Orden Francisco de Miranda, Primera Clase (1 medalla, 1 botón) – Venezuela
 1983: Orden Francisco de Miranda, Segunda Clase (1 medalla, 1 botón) – Venezuela
 1984-01-12: Orden Andrés Bello, Banda de Honor (1 medalla, 1 botón) – Venezuela
 1984-05-16: Orden Isabel la Católica, Grado Encomienda de Número (1 collar, 1 placa, 4 medallitas, 2 botones) – Spain
 1984-06-12: Orden del Libertador, Gran Oficial, Segunda Clase (1 medalla, 1 botón – Venezuela
 1990-12: Orden del Libertador, Gran Cordón (2 medallas, 1 botón) – Venezuela
 2004-10-30: Orden del Congreso de Colombia en el Grado de Oficial – Colombia
 2004-10-30: Orden de la Democracia Simón Bolívar en el Grado de Gran Cruz – Colombia
 Orden Diego de Losada, Primera Clase (1 collar, 1 prendedor, 2 botones) – Venezuela
 Orden al Mérito del Ministerio Público, Primera Clase (1 collar, 1 medallita, 2 botones) – Venezuela
 Llave de la ciudad de Cartagena de Indias – Colombia
 Cultura Campesina Colombia ACPO (1 collar) – Colombia

Honors 
 2000: Golden Plate Award of the American Academy of Achievement
 2001: International Emmy Directorate Award
 2004: Smithsonian Institution, Woodrow Wilson Center, Woodrow Wilson Award for Public Service
 2005: MIPCOM, Personality of the Year
 Advertising Educational Foundation, Lifetime Achievement Award
 2015: NATPE Brandon Tartikoff Legacy Award Recipient, with his daughter, Adriana Cisneros
 2017: University of Miami, Doctor of humane letters

Leadership 
 Americas Society, Chairman's International Advisory Council
 Babson College, Board of Overseers
 Barrick Gold Corporation, Board of Directors; Member, International Advisory Board and Compensation Committee; Chair, Corporate Governance and Nominating Committee
 Cardinal Cisneros Foundation, Board of Trustees
 Council for the Atlantic Institute of Government, Member
 Global Information Infrastructure Commission (GIIC), Commissioner
 Haiti's Presidential Advisory Council on Economic Growth and Investment
 Harvard University, David Rockefeller Center for Latin American Studies, Advisory Committee
 Ibero-American Council for Productivity and Competitiveness, Member
 International Center for Economic Growth, Board of Overseers
 Rockefeller University, University Council, Member
 RRE Ventures LLC, Senior Advisor
 United Nations Information and Communication Technologies (ICT) Task Force, Charter Member

Past affiliations 
 All-American Bottling Corporation, Chairman of the Board
 Chase Manhattan Bank, International Advisory Committee
 DirecTV, Executive Committee
 Georgetown University, Board of Trustees and the Latin American Board
 Hicks, Muse, Tate & Furst, Latin America Strategy Board of Directors
 Museum of Modern Art, Chairman's Council
 Panama Canal Authority, Board Member
 Panamerican Beverages, Inc., Board Member
 Power Corporation of Canada, Advisory Council
 Pueblo International, LLC, Board Member
 Queen Sofia Spanish Institute, Board of Directors
 The Nature Conservancy, Latin America Conservation Council
 United Nations Association of the United States, Member
 Univision Communications, Board Member
 World Economic Forum, Board of Governors for the Media, Communications and Entertainment Industries

See also
 Colección Patricia Phelps de Cisneros
 List of Venezuelan Americans

References

Further reading 
 
 
 
 
Video

External links 

 Gustavo Cisneros at Grupo Cisneros
 
 
 

1945 births
Living people
People from Caracas
Dominican Republic businesspeople
Dominican Republic billionaires
Venezuelan television company founders
Venezuelan billionaires
Babson College alumni
Venezuelan expatriates in the Dominican Republic
Naturalized citizens of the Dominican Republic
International Emmy Directorate Award
Cisneros family
Venezuelan art collectors